Härmä is a village in Setomaa Parish, Võru County in southeastern Estonia.

As of 2011 Census, the settlement's population was 6.

References

Villages in Võru County